Ninety One is an Anglo-South African asset management business, based in London and Cape Town and dual-listed on the London Stock Exchange and the Johannesburg Stock Exchange. It is a constituent of the FTSE 250 index.

History
The company was formed as Investec Asset Management in 1991. It changed its name to Ninety One in spring 2020: the new name is in recognition of the brand's heritage, as it was in 1991 that the investment firm was started in South Africa.

The company was demerged from Investec in March 2020. It had been envisaged that 10% of the stock would be offered to the public but Investec decided to retain 25% (rather than just 15% as originally planned) because of market conditions.

References

External links

 

Financial services companies established in 1991
Corporate spin-offs
Companies listed on the Johannesburg Stock Exchange
Companies listed on the London Stock Exchange
Dual-listed companies